The Coupe de France 1975–76 was its 59th edition. It was won by Olympique de Marseille which defeated Olympique Lyonnais in the Final.

Round of 16

Quarter-finals

Semi-finals

Final

References

French federation

1975–76 domestic association football cups
1975–76 in French football
1975-76